Los Quetzales National Park, located 97 kilometers from San Isidro de El General, Costa Rica, it was created in 2006 by decree 32981-MINAE.   It is managed under the Central Conservation Area of the National System of Conservation Areas.

Stretching across , the national park has limited facilities including a small ranger station and a single, highly mountainous main road.

The national park is surrounded by the Los Santos Forest Reserve on its north, west, south sides, and by the Tapantí National Park on its northeast side.  The park was created by allocating the area from Los Santos Forest Reserve.

Flora and fauna
The park predominantly protects cloud forest and is named for the Resplendent Quetzal., which inhabits the area and is the national bird of Guatemala.

Ramsar site
Part of the  Ramsar site is located within this protected area and shared with Chirripó National Park, Tapantí National Park, Los Santos Forest Reserve, Vueltas Hill Biological Reserve  and Macho River Forest Reserve.  When the Ramsar site was designated in 2003, the area of the park was still part of Los Santos Forest Reserve.

Access
The northeast border of the protected area corresponds partially to the Route 2,  (South Inter-american Highway), which is part of the Pan-American Highway and used to access the park from either the north coming from the Greater Metropolitan Area (San José and Cartago) or from the south (Pérez Zeledón).

References

National parks of Costa Rica
Protected areas established in 2005